Wilfrid Ewart "Wilfie" Reid (3 November 1884 – 24 November 1973) was an English professional golfer and golf course designer. Reid was born in Bulwell, Nottingham, England, and died in West Palm Beach, Florida, United States. He posted three top-10 finishes in major championship tournaments.

Early life

Reid, the son of Arthur Reid and his wife Elizabeth Reid née Potter, studied club and ball making under Tommy Armour's father, Willie, in Edinburgh, Scotland.  A scratch golfer at 15, Reid turned professional at 17 and became head professional at Seacroft Golf Club in Skegness, England and was a protégé of Harry Vardon who helped him get a club professional job at La Boulie Golf Club, Versailles, France, in 1903. In 1905 he became the professional at Banstead Downs Golf Club in Sutton, London, England, for roughly nine years and was a successful tournament player.  Reid – who was never short on confidence – was a fine competitive golfer despite being small of stature, and he beat his mentor, Vardon, on several occasions.

In March 1906, Reid married Stella Toft at Nottinghamshire, England. The couple had three daughters.

1913 U.S. Open
On 7 August 1913 Reid set sail from Liverpool aboard the RMS Celtic and visited America with Vardon and Ted Ray where they played in a number of tournaments including the famous 1913 U.S. Open in which he tied for 16th. Reid tied Vardon for the 2nd round lead and played with Francis Ouimet in the 3rd round.  In 1915 he tied 10th.  His best finish, a tie for fourth, came in the 1916 U.S. Open held at the Minikahda Club in Minneapolis, Minnesota.

Emigration to America
In February 1915 Reid emigrated to America at the invitation of Clarence H. Geist to be the golf professional at Seaview Golf Club in Galloway, New Jersey, after the outbreak of World War I. He later, at the suggestion of the DuPont family, became the golf professional at the Wilmington Country Club, Wilmington, Delaware.  He became a member of the PGA of America in 1917 and was appointed to the national PGA Executive Committee as a vice-president at large, a position he held for two years.

In August 1920 he was elected vice-president of the PGA of America and he was re-elected in 1921. In 1920 and 1921 he also held the office of secretary of the Southeastern Section PGA.  In 1921 Reid obtained U.S. citizenship and in December of that year attended the founding meeting of the Philadelphia Section PGA and was a member of the organising committee.  Later in 1929 he was the president of the Michigan Section PGA for three years.

Golf career
Reid served as a professional at several of America's top clubs, including Country Club of Detroit, Grosse Pointe Farms, Grosse Pointe Farms, Michigan, Beverly Country Club, Chicago, Illinois, Broadmoor Golf Club, Colorado Springs, Colorado, Seminole Golf Club, North Palm Beach, Florida, and Atlantic City Country Club, Northfield, New Jersey. He won the 1926 Michigan PGA Championship and had 26 holes-in-one in his long playing career.

The border of his stationery – that he used to send customers' golf club orders to club-makers such as George Izett of Bailey & Izett Inc. – listed so many of his accomplishments as a golfer and course designer that there was very little room left for him to write his message.

Golf course designer
Reid was also a golf course designer.  Reid began designing golf courses at an early age and laid out courses in Europe and Britain before settling in the United States. He once estimated that he had designed 58 courses and remodeled some 43 others during his design career. While based in Michigan during the 1920s, he partnered with another club professional, William Connellan. The firm of Reid and Connellan designed some 20 courses in Michigan alone.

Reid retired to Florida in the early 1950s and consistently improved his game in both social and competitive rounds. Even into old age he continued to "beat his age" in score on his birthday.

Death and legacy
Reid died on 24 November 1973 at West Palm Beach, Florida. He was posthumously inducted into the Michigan Golf Hall of Fame in 1985, and the Michigan Section PGA of America Golf Hall of Fame in 2015.

Tournament wins
1926 Michigan PGA Championship

Results in major championships

Note: Reid never played in the Masters Tournament, founded in 1934.

NYF = Tournament not yet founded
NT = No tournament
DNP = Did not play
CUT = missed the half-way cut
R64, R32, R16, QF, SF = Round in which player lost in PGA Championship match play
"T" indicates a tie for a place
Yellow background for top-10

Team appearances
England–Scotland Professional Match (representing England): 1906 (winners) 1907 (winners), 1909 (winners), 1910 (winners), 1912 (tie), 1913 (winners)
Coronation Match (representing the Professionals): 1911 (winners)
Great Britain vs USA (representing America): 1921

Delaware designs
DuPont Country Club – the original DuPont Course, Wilmington, Delaware, 1921
Wilmington Country Club – original course, now Ed Oliver Golf Club, Wilmington, Delaware
Newark Country Club, Newark, Delaware, 1921

Michigan designs
Black River Country Club, (Reid, Connellan), Port Huron, Michigan, 1927
Indian River Golf Club, (original 9 hole), (Reid), Indian River, Michigan
Birmingham Country Club, (Reid), Birmingham, Michigan, 1916
Water’s Edge Golf Course, (Reid), Grosse Ile, Michigan (9-hole course commissioned by Bunkie Knudsen)
Brae Burn Golf Club, (original 9 hole - now the back 9 holes), (Reid, Connellan), Plymouth, Michigan, 1923
Gaylord Country Club, (Reid), Gaylord, Michigan, 1924
Indianwood Golf and Country Club – Old Course, (Reid, Conellan), Lake Orion, Michigan, 1925
Tam-O'Shanter Country Club, (Reid, Connellan), West Bloomfield, Michigan, 1926 (redesigned)
Bald Mountain Golf Course, (regulation course), (Reid, Connellan), Lake Orion, Michigan, 1929
Flushing Valley Country Club, (original 9 hole), (Reid, Connellan), Flushing, Michigan, 1930

Other designs
Olympic Club – original Lakeside Golf Club course, San Francisco, 1917
La Boulie Golf Club – France
La Vallee course – Belgium

Photo gallery

See also
Olympic Club Golf Club section
The Greatest Game Ever Played: Harry Vardon, Francis Ouimet, and the Birth of Modern Golf by Mark Frost
A Chronicle of the Philadelphia Section PGA and its Members by Peter C. Trenham, The Leaders and The Legends 1916 to 1921
A Chronicle of the Philadelphia Section PGA and its Members by Peter C. Trenham, The Southeastern Section of the PGA 1916 to 1921

Notes
His first name is often misspelled as "Wilfred", such as in the movie and book The Greatest Game Ever Played. Occasionally, his middle initial is incorrectly documented "A." as well.

References

External links
Wilfred Reid Taking a Swing
Andrew Carnegie II, Wilfred Reid and George Crocker Golfing
Andrew Carnegie II Learning to Play Golf

English male golfers
American male golfers
Golf course architects
People from Bulwell
Sportspeople from Nottinghamshire
English emigrants to the United States
1884 births
1973 deaths